Škrljevo  is a village in Primorje, Croatia, located north of Bakar. The population is 1,344 (census 2011).

References

Populated places in Primorje-Gorski Kotar County